The 12 Hours of Reims were a sports car endurance racing series held from 1953 to 1967 at the circuit Reims-Gueux.

Race report 
 42nd Grand Prix de l'ACF - 12 heures internationales Reims
 June 30, 1956,  Circuit Reims (France), 8.302 km,  non-championship race
 Classes: engines up to 750 cc (S750), 1500 cc (S1.5), 2000 cc (S2.0), 3500 cc (S3.5)
 Pole Position overall:  #26 Jaguar D-type,  Desmond Titterington / Jack Fairman,  2:35.30 - 192.45 km/h (119.58 mph)
 Fastest Lap overall:  #25 Jaguar D-type,  Duncan Hamilton, 2:37.20 - 190.12 km/h (118.14 mph)

Results Overall

Podium by class

References 

12 Hours of Reims
12 Hours of Reims